The Adventures of Pirx was a television mini-series in Hungary in 1973 based on the 1968 science fiction short story collection Tales of Pirx the Pilot by Polish writer Stanisław Lem. Five episodes were aired.

References

1973 Hungarian television series debuts
1973 Hungarian television series endings
1970s science fiction television series
Hungarian science fiction films
Films based on works by Stanisław Lem
Films based on books